Fox, Fowler, and Company was a British private bank, based in Wellington, Somerset.  The company was founded in 1787 as a supplementary business to the main activities of the Fox family, sheep-herding and wool-making.

Banknote issue
Like many other commercial banks of the time, Fox, Fowler, and Company was legally entitled to issue its own banknotes. However, when the Bank Charter Act was passed in 1844, no new banks could issue notes in England and Wales, and the number of note-issuing institutions fell gradually with financial sector consolidation.  Fox, Fowler, and Company was the last commercial note-issuing bank in England and Wales, until it was bought out by Lloyds Bank in 1921. Under the terms of the 1844 act, the bank lost the legal right to issue banknotes upon its merger with Lloyds, and the Bank of England became the sole note-issuing bank in England and Wales.

Some commercial banks in Scotland and Northern Ireland retain the right to issue bank notes, but only the Bank of England may now issue sterling bank notes in England and Wales.

This original £5 note is on display at Tone Dale House, which Thomas Fox built in 1801.

See also
Banknotes of the pound sterling
Bank of England note issues
 Coldharbour Mill
Tone Dale House

References

External links
The British Museum: A 1921 Fox, Fowler, and Company £5 note

Defunct banks of the United Kingdom
Former banknote issuers of the United Kingdom
Banks established in 1787
Companies based in Somerset
History of Somerset
Banks disestablished in 1921
1787 establishments in England
Wellington, Somerset
1921 disestablishments in England
British companies disestablished in 1921